All Wrapped Up is a 7-track Christmas-themed extended play featuring musical artists signed to Hollywood Records singing their own versions of holiday songs. It was released on November 4, 2008, available exclusively at Target stores nationwide.

Track listing

Chart performance 
All Wrapped Up debuted at number 53 on the Billboard 200. and peaked at #10 in its eighth week on the chart.

Charts

See also
 List of Billboard Top Holiday Albums number ones of the 2000s

References

2008 EPs
2008 Christmas albums
Christmas compilation albums
2008 compilation albums
Hollywood Records compilation albums
Hollywood Records EPs
Pop rock compilation albums
Pop rock Christmas albums